César Geoffray (20 February 1901 – 24 December 1972) was a French composer.

1901 births
1972 deaths
20th-century French composers
French male composers
Musicians from Lyon
20th-century French male musicians